Glinn may refer to:
 Burt Glinn (1925-2008), Magnum photographer
 Glinn (Star Trek), Cardassian officer rank title
 Gael Linn, Irish language organisation
 Lillian Glinn (1902–1978), American classic female blues and country blues singer and songwriter

See also
 Glin (disambiguation)
 Glyn (disambiguation)
 Glynn (disambiguation)
 Glynne (disambiguation)
 Glenn (disambiguation)